Bergerac or de Bergerac may refer to:

Places
 Bergerac, Dordogne, a town in France
 Bergerac Dordogne Périgord Airport, airport serving the town
 Gare de Bergerac, the town's railway station
 Bergerac Périgord FC, the town's football team
 Arrondissement of Bergerac, the administrative region that includes the town

Other uses
 Bergerac (TV series), a British detective series set in Jersey
 Bergerac wine, a French wine appellation
 Cyrano de Bergerac (play), 1897 play by Edmond Rostand
 "Bergerac", a 1992 track by Spiderbait from Shashavaglava

People 
 Cyrano de Bergerac (1619–1655), French dramatist and duelist
 Jacques Bergerac (1927–2014), French actor
 Michel Bergerac (1932–2016), French businessman

See also 
 Cyrano de Bergerac (disambiguation)